Robert Joseph Wittman (born February 3, 1959) is an American politician serving as the U.S. representative for  since 2007. The district stretches from the fringes of the Washington suburbs to the Hampton Roads area. He is a member of the Republican Party.

Early life, education and career
Wittman was born in Washington, D.C., the son of adoptive parents Regina C. (née Wood) and Frank Joseph Wittman. His father was of German descent and his mother's ancestors included immigrants from Ireland and Canada. He grew up in Henrico County, Virginia. He attended Virginia Tech as a member of the Corps of Cadets and Army ROTC and studied biology. While at Virginia Tech, he spent the summers working at a tomato cannery and on a fishing vessel. Also while in college, Wittman was a member of the Delta Tau Delta fraternity. He earned a master's degree in public health from the University of North Carolina at Chapel Hill in 1990 and a Ph.D. from Virginia Commonwealth University in 2002. Wittman worked for 20 years with the Virginia Department of Health. He served as an environmental health specialist and was field director for the Division of Shellfish Sanitation.

Wittman served on the Montross Town Council from 1986 to 1996 and as mayor of the Town of Montross from 1992 to 1996. Two of his major accomplishments in this office were the overhaul of the sewage system and the development of a computerized system for tax billing. From 1996 to 2005, Wittman served on the Westmoreland County Board of Supervisors, the last two years as chair. He helped create new libraries and pushed for raises in teacher salaries.

Virginia House of Delegates
In 2005, Wittman was elected to the Virginia House of Delegates, representing the 99th district. He served on the Agricultural; Chesapeake and Natural Resources; and Police and Public Safety Committees.

U.S. House of Representatives

Committee assignments
 Committee on Armed Services
 Subcommittee on Tactical Air and Land Forces
 Subcommittee on Seapower and Projection Forces  (Ranking Member)
 Committee on Natural Resources
 Subcommittee on Fisheries, Wildlife, Oceans and Insular Affairs

Caucus memberships
 House Baltic Caucus
Congressional Constitution Caucus
United States Congressional International Conservation Caucus
Congressional Shipbuilding Caucus
Congressional Public Health Caucus
 Republican Study Committee

Political positions
In 2010, Wittman's stated platforms included support for corporate tax cuts, expanding broadband, and cutting spending. He cosponsored legislation that would place a 2-year moratorium on capital gains and dividends taxes, cut the payroll tax rate and the self-employed tax rate in half for two years, and reduce the lowest income brackets by 5% each. He also favors deregulation.

Wittman co-sponsored a personhood bill in Congress that defined life as beginning at conception.

In 2012, Wittman said he would consider cutting pay and benefits for service members who join the military in the future in order to avoid closing bases or cutting the number of military personnel.

Wittman authored the Chesapeake Bay Accountability and Recovery Act, designed "to enhance coordination, flexibility and efficiency of restoration efforts," according to Wittman. After several senators sponsored a bill to reauthorize the North American Wetlands Conservation Act, Wittman introduced a version of the bill for House members to consider. He proposed the Advancing Offshore Wind Production Act (H.R. 1398), which he said was designed to simplify the process companies must go through to test and develop offshore wind power.

Immigration
Wittman has said the "immigration system is broken. To keep America strong and prosperous, we need an immigration system that works for the American people." He supports ending chain migration, implementing e-verify, eliminating the visa-lottery system, funding a southern border wall, increased border security and immigration enforcement, and revision of legal immigration. During the 115th Congress, Wittman voted to provide $1.6 billion for border security measures to enforce existing immigration laws, and The Project Safe Neighborhoods Grant Program Authorization Act.

In November 2018, Wittman said that "85 percent [of immigrants] don’t show up for a scheduled court hearing or call to schedule a court hearing." PolitiFact found that his claim was false. Wittman said he got the information from Representative Bob Goodlatte, who in turn said he got it from the conservative website Newsmax, which attributed the claim to an anonymous "senior Los Angeles County Sheriff’s detective".

Health care
Wittman opposes the Affordable Care Act and has voted to repeal it. He said that Congress should not merely be "anti-Obamacare" and that Congressional Republicans are ready to provide alternatives if it is deemed unconstitutional. In 2017, he voted for the American Health Care Act, which would have repealed and replaced the ACA.

Texas v. Pennsylvania
In December 2020, Wittman was one of 126 Republican members of the House of Representatives to sign an amicus brief in support of Texas v. Pennsylvania, a lawsuit filed at the United States Supreme Court contesting the results of the 2020 presidential election, in which Joe Biden defeated incumbent Donald Trump. The Supreme Court declined to hear the case on the basis that Texas lacked standing under Article III of the Constitution to challenge the results of an election held by another state.

Certification of 2020 presidential election 
On January 6, 2021, Wittman was one of the 147 Republican members of the U.S. Congress who objected to certifying the 2020 presidential election. He voted against certifying Pennsylvania's electors after a day of violence as the U.S. Capitol was breached by Trump supporters who disrupted proceedings, despite no clear evidence of widespread voter fraud.

Political campaigns

2005
Wittman was first elected to the Virginia House of Delegates over Democrat Linda M. Crandell.

2007
Wittman was reelected to the Virginia House of Delegates unopposed.
On December 11, 2007, Wittman was first elected to the United States Congress to succeed the late Congresswoman Jo Ann Davis, who died in October 2007. He was heavily favored in the special election due to the 1st's heavy Republican bent; it has been in Republican hands since 1977. The Independent candidate was Lucky Narain.

2008

Wittman was elected to his first full term, defeating Democratic nominee Bill Day and Libertarian Nathan Larson.

2010

Wittman was reelected, defeating Democratic nominee Krystal Ball and Independent Green candidate Gail Parker.

2012

Wittman was reelected, defeating Democratic nominee Adam Cook and Independent Green candidate Gail Parker.

2014

Wittman defeated Democratic nominee Norm Mosher, Libertarian Xavian Draper, and Independent Green Gail Parker.

2016

Wittman defeated Democratic nominee Matt Rowe and Independent Green candidate Gail Parker.

2018

Wittman defeated Democratic nominee Vangie Williams. With the Republicans losing their remaining seat based in the Washington suburbs, as well as seats in Hampton Roads and the Richmond suburbs, Wittman was left as the only Republican holding a seat east of Charlottesville.

2020 
Wittman defeated Democratic nominee Qasim Rashid.

2022 
Wittman defeated Democratic nominee Herb Jones and Independent David Foster.

Electoral history

Personal life
Wittman is a member of St. James Episcopal Church in Montross.

References

External links

 Congressman Rob Wittman official U.S. House website
 Rob Wittman for Congress 
 
 
 

|-

1959 births
21st-century American politicians
American adoptees
American Episcopalians
Episcopalians from Virginia
Living people
Mayors of places in Virginia
Republican Party members of the Virginia House of Delegates
People from Montross, Virginia
Republican Party members of the United States House of Representatives from Virginia
UNC Gillings School of Global Public Health alumni
Virginia city council members
Virginia Commonwealth University alumni
Virginia Tech alumni